Detective Yelina Salas is a fictional character on the CBS crime drama CSI: Miami, portrayed by Sofia Milos. Milos is credited as a main cast member throughout the series' third season, and a recurring cast member throughout the first, second, fifth, sixth, and seventh seasons, respectively. The character appeared in 60 episodes.

Character's background
During the first half of the series, Yelina Salas worked as a detective in the Miami-Dade Police Robbery-Homicide Division (RHD). In "Money For Nothing" (S2 E17), it is revealed she is of Colombian ancestry. Her surname is of Spanish origin, and she is bilingual (English//Spanish).

Yelina has a close connection with Horatio Caine, the head of the Miami-Dade Crime Lab because she is his sister-in-law. Yelina is the widow of his late brother, Raymond Caine (Sr.), an undercover narcotics officer who was killed in the line of duty. Yelina and Ray had one child together, Raymond Caine Jr., (episode 117, "Simple Man"). 

In the Season 2 premiere ("Blood Brothers"), after Yelina confronts Horatio about his feelings, he admits to her how he had once thought they might be together had she not met his brother Raymond first. However, he states he can't, in good conscience, act on his feelings towards her as he still sees her as his brother's wife. This clearly disappoints Yelina.

Horatio always deeply cared for Yelina and instinctually attempted to protect her from the worst of her husband's revealed misdeeds. Among many things, he conceals, the existence of Ray Sr.'s out-of-wedlock daughter, Madison Keaton, (episode 208, "Big Brother"). However, Horatio is forced to reveal her existence when Madison falls ill, requiring a transplant. Her half-brother, Ray Jr., is found to be a donor match. Though Yelina is initially very hurt by the revelation, she permits the transplant surgery in the best interest of both her son and his half-sister (episode 316, "Nothing to Lose").

She later becomes romantically involved with MDPD Internal Affairs Sergeant Rick Stetler, a personal nemesis of Horatio. In one episode, when she shows up to work with a black eye, Horatio immediately suspects Stetler of physically abusing her. Horatio warns him: "Touch her again and I will kill you" (episode 307, "Crime Wave").

Horatio continued to be in love with Yelina in spite of realizing her true love may always be his brother, Raymond. His feelings for her continued even during her relationship with Stetler. As for Yelina, she loved Horatio but was not in love with him.  In season 4, he began a romantic relationship with Marisol Delko, Eric Delko's sister, who looked very much like Yelina.

Departure
After a traumatic case in which Ray Jr. was kidnapped, Horatio tells Yelina that a vacation would do them all good. But Horatio has a surprise for her. Because he knows and accepts that Yelina is still in love with her (presumed) deceased husband Raymond, to her surprise, she learns she is not going with Horatio, but with her husband, Ray Sr., who is very much alive. Only recently had it been discovered that he faked his death to go even deeper undercover for the DEA (episode 324, "10-7"). Together, the family of 3 flies to Brazil without telling anyone where they were going. So secretive was their departure that Salas's colleague Detective Frank Tripp does not even know if she's still alive and well, ("Under Suspicion").

Return
Unfortunately, Ray Sr. soon gets back into trouble, this time involving the Mala Noche drug gang in Rio de Janeiro. Yelina grows increasingly worried about him, especially when he vanishes without a trace. Horatio and Eric Delko, who are in Rio in an unsanctioned pursuit of Mala Noche leader Antonio Riaz, discover to their horror that Riaz has beaten Ray Sr. to death and, furthermore, that Riaz is attempting to corrupt Ray Jr. into becoming a drug runner for him. Everything is satisfactorily resolved, however, and Yelina and her son decide to try to start afresh in Miami (episode 501, "Rio").

Salas finds employment for herself as a private investigator but Horatio is concerned about the dangers of this profession. Yelina calmly reminds him that she had been a cop and could take care of herself (episode 522, "Burned"). 

In an ironic twist of fate, Horatio later comes to her for help investigating a young parolee who is a suspect in the murder of his parole officer. Yelina obtains the young man's birth certificate, which lists the father as John Walden. Horatio claims that he "knew him once", thus continuing his pattern throughout the series of over-protective deception towards Yelina. "John Walden" was, in fact, Horatio's undercover alias sixteen years before in Pensacola. The young man in question turns out to be his long-lost son, Kyle Harmon.

Fictional Miami-Dade Police Department detectives
CSI: Miami characters
Fictional private investigators
Television characters introduced in 2003